Huerfano Butte (English: "Orphan Butte") is a small rocky butte located on the western flank of the Santa Rita Mountains in southeastern Pima County, Arizona.

Archaeology
Huerfano Butte and the surrounding area were utilized by the Hohokam as early as circa 1100 CE. Shallow bedrock forces ground water to surface in a small pool located in a wash on the south side of the butte. Exposed outcrops of granite on either side of the wash have about fifty bedrock mortars, at least two small bedrock metates, and numerous smaller cupules. Along the same wash is a vertical stone surface with approximately two dozen weathered pictographs painted in red hematite. The pictographs include human and animal life forms, as well as concentric circles, all of which are coated in "desert varnish."

In 1965, Huerfano Butte gained public notoriety when a young girl discovered an extensive prehistoric jewelry cache while on a picnic with her family. While exploring cracks and crevices on the butte, the young girl discovered a small pottery jar filled with about 1,500 turquoise and glycimeris shell beads and pendants. The pottery jar and lid containing the jewelry were turned over to the Arizona State Museum upon discovery, and were dated to approximately 1100 CE. The pottery was identified as Gila plainware from the Rincon phase.

Today, Huerfano Butte is only open to those with permission, in order to help protect the site's cultural resources.

Gallery

See also
 Larcena Pennington Page
 Helvetia, Arizona

References

Archaeological sites in Arizona
Landforms of Pima County, Arizona
Hohokam rock art sites
Petroglyphs in Arizona
Buttes of Arizona